Christopher Alfred Ahrens (born July 31, 1952) is an American former professional ice hockey defenseman who played six seasons in the National Hockey League for the Minnesota North Stars, and four games in the WHA with the Edmonton Oilers.

Ahrens was born in San Bernardino, California, and grew up in Freeport, New York.

Playing career 
Ahrens was drafted in the fifth round, 76th overall in the 1972 NHL Entry Draft by the Minnesota North Stars. Chris played the majority of his professional career in the minor leagues (AHL, CHL), interspersed with 53 games, over 6 seasons, with the North Stars, as well as 4 games with the Edmonton Oilers in the World Hockey Association.

Career statistics

External links

Ahrens at Hockeydraftcentral.com

1952 births
American men's ice hockey defensemen
Cleveland Barons (1937–1973) players
Edmonton Oilers (WHA) players
Fort Worth Texans players
Ice hockey players from California
Jacksonville Barons players
Kitchener Rangers players
Living people
Minnesota North Stars draft picks
Minnesota North Stars players
New Haven Nighthawks players
Rhode Island Reds players
Sportspeople from San Bernardino, California